The Golshan gas field is one of the NIOC Recent Discoveries which is located at approximately 180 km south east of Bushehr, 65 km offshore the Persian Gulf. The volume of gas in place (GIP) of the field is estimated at 42 to 56 TCF.

On December 26, 2007, the contract for development of the field was signed between NIOC and SKS of Malaysia, in the presence of the Petroleum Minister of Iran.

See also

World Largest Gas Fields
NIOC Recent Discoveries
Iran Natural Gas Reserves
South Pars Gas Field
North Pars
Ferdowsi Gas Field
Persian LNG

References

Natural gas fields in Iran